Intimate Stranger may refer to:

 Intimate stranger, a social concept

Film and TV
 Intimate Strangers (1977 film), an American made-for-TV drama, also known as Battered
 Intimate Strangers (2004 film), a 2004 French film
 Intimate Strangers (2018 film), a 2018 South Korean film
 Intimate Strangers (miniseries), a 1981 Australian miniseries
 The Intimate Stranger (1947 film), an Australian film from director Roy Darling that was never completed
 The Intimate Stranger (1956 film), 1956 British drama film
 Intimate Strangers, a 1986 film directed by Robert Ellis Miller
 Intimate Stranger, a 1991 documentary directed by Alan Berliner
 Intimate Stranger, a 1991 thriller television film starring Debbie Harry
 "Intimate Stranger", a 1996 episode of the television series Xena: Warrior Princess

Music
 Intimate Strangers, an album by Tom Scott
 "Intimate Strangers", a song by Suzi Quatro from the album Oh, Suzi Q.